Aristotelia baltica is a moth of the family Gelechiidae. It is found in Bosnia and Herzegovina, the Baltic region and Russia. The range extends to the Russian Far East.

References

Moths described in 1983
Aristotelia (moth)
Moths of Europe
Moths of Asia